This is the general discography of the South African rock band Seether.

Albums

Studio albums

Video albums

Compilation albums

Extended plays

Singles

Music videos

Soundtrack appearances

References

Heavy metal group discographies
Discographies of South African artists